Tchitchide  is a village in the Doufelgou Prefecture in the Kara Region of north-eastern Togo. The village has an elevation of 356 m and is 23 km near with Niamtuu.

See also
 List of cities in Togo

References

Populated places in Kara Region
Doufelgou Prefecture